Agdistis maghrebi is a moth in the family Pterophoridae. It is known from Algeria.

The wingspan is 21–28 mm. The forewings are greyish brown.

References

Agdistinae
Endemic fauna of Algeria
Moths described in 1976
Moths of Africa